Torngat Mountains National Park is a Canadian national park located on the Labrador Peninsula in the province of Newfoundland and Labrador. The park encompasses  of mountainous terrain between Northern Quebec and the Labrador Sea. It is the largest national park in Atlantic Canada and the southernmost national park in the Arctic Cordillera. It contains the highest mountains in Mainland Canada east of the Rockies. The Torngat Mountains National Park was created to honour the relationship that Labrador and Nunavik Inuit have with the land. Parks Canada works with these groups in order to conserve the ecological integrity of the land, as well as to inform visitors of the park's history with the Inuit groups. The subarctic mountains are the Inuit homeland, a treasure trove of the powerful stories, spirits and traditions of centuries of travellers. The area in and around the park is governed by the Inuit people and it has been named "Nunatsiavut", translating to "our beautiful land" in their native language. The mountains are an important place for the Inuit people and have been known as the "place of spirits". An area called Torngat Mountains National Park Reserve was set aside with enactment of the Labrador Inuit Land Claims Agreement on December 1, 2005, with the intention of creating a national park. When the Nunavik Inuit Land Claims Agreement came into effect on July 10, 2008, the park was officially established, and the National Park Reserve became Torngat Mountains National Park, the first in Labrador. In Torngat Mountains, there are diverse animal and plant species in ecological communities. Indigenous cultures are deeply connected to and dependent on caribou for their food resources and cultures. This park protects wildlife including: caribou, black bears, wolf packs, two species of fox, polar bears, peregrine falcon, and golden eagle among others. Four different climatic regions enable these different species to co-exist. As the temperature rises, the ice in this area shrinks and shrubs grow rapidly, affecting local residents, species and tourists. The park is open year-round and is accessible via charter air flight, cruise ship, or snowmobile. It offers wilderness-oriented recreational activities such as, hiking, scrambling, and kayaking.

Creation of park 

During the 1970s, the Parks Canada Agency had a goal of creating national parks in 39 divided regions of the country, which were chosen based on vegetation and landscape. The Torngat Mountains were chosen to be conserved as part of this plan. Labrador and Nunavik Inuit also had interests in conserving the Torngat Mountains, as the land is embedded in their culture and history. The goal of collaborating with these Inuit groups was made to honour their rights, interests, and the relationship they have with the land. Being the tallest mountains in Canada, aside from the Rocky Mountains, the Torngat Mountains were a desired landscape to conserve. Usage of the park is meant for all Canadians to enjoy, with special interest being given to Nunavik and Labrador Inuit to use the designated land and its resources. These are some of the intended purposes for the park being built.

Some of the goals of the park include maintaining its ecological integrity, sharing the Inuit story, and attracting more visitors to support business of the park. The goal of ecological integrity has been maintained through recent designations addressing the concerns about the Torngat Mountains. These include the isolated and divided range that species could be found in and human disturbances of the area. To expand beyond hunting and fishing activities, the Nunavik Tourism Association was established, which helped with their business expansion goals and teaching of Inuit history. Some regional Inuit organizations were also created to address resource management, environmental protection, and economic development needs.

The boundaries of the park include the low watermark of the Labrador Sea to the east, Saglek Fjord to the south, the provincial boundary with Quebec to the west, and the tip of Newfoundland in the north. It does not include the Iron Strand, as it is owned by Labrador Inuit. The park does not extend past Newfoundland's provincial bounds, which is how the borders to the west were chosen. It extends all the way to the eastern coastline of Newfound, where the Grenfell Sound, Eclipse Channel, and Bears Gut are located. There is no further information on how the southern border of the park was chosen.

First Nations 

On December 1, 2005, the Inuit peoples and the Canadian Government signed the "Labrador Inuit Land Claim Agreement" (LILCA). The agreement gave the power of 72,520 square kilometres of land, in Northern Labrador, over to the Inuit people. The Inuit people now govern this land and have given it the name "Nunatsiavut". Nunatsiavut translates to our beautiful land in Inuktitut, a common Inuit language.

The Torngat Mountains National Park is part of the Nunatsiavut region and is co-run by both the Canadian government and the Nunatsiavut government. This means that both powers must share the upkeep and management, as well as the resources it provides. Torngat Mountains was known as a park reserve since 2005, but became a national park on July 10, 2008, after the Land Claim Agreement came into legal effect. When the LILCA was signed, they also signed the Park Impacts and Benefits Agreement (PIBA). This agreement details the Inuit importance for the park's natural land and ecosystems and sees that it will be honoured. The mountains are a very spiritual place for the Inuit and many would journey there seeking guidance from "spirit helpers". The name Torngat actually comes from the Inuktitut word Tongait, meaning "place of spirits".

Fauna 
Torngat mountains, home to the Inuit in Canada, are also lands and resources for diverse species. Caribou, polar bears and arctic hares are some of the animals found in the area along with bird species and wolves. Caribou and wolves are in a prey-predator relationship and caribou depend on lichen in the winter. Parks Canada Agency found some seals (i.e., ringed seals, hooded seals, harp seals, harbour seals, etc.) and whales swimming along the coast of the Torngat Mountains. Four different climatic regions (i.e., mountain alpine climate, coastal fjords and headlands climate, southern interior valleys climate, and arctic flora) across the Torngat Mountains create ideal environments for various species to live.

Harlequin ducks, caribou, and peregrine falcons are identified as species at risk, found in the Torngat Mountains. Caribou are identified as species at risk, due to numerous human activities occurring in the Mountains. Over 38 years, the population trends of caribou in the Mountains are experiencing a decline, at the rate of 81%. Some human activities driving caribou's population decline are mining, industrial development, overhunting, overharvesting, and climate change. Caribou show patterns of avoiding to reside in the proximity of mining areas up to 6 km. Although mining scores negligible as a threat, caribou’s safety is uncertain with the expected increase in mining and development activities. Building dams and implementing hydroelectricity projects cause a decline in caribou, causing a disturbance in their space and habitat use.

Historically, caribou have been cultural and traditional resources for groups of Indigenous people (i.e., the Cree, Inuit, Naskapi, etc.). Sport hunting in Quebec and Labrador, on the other hand, has been banned since 2012 in Quebec and 2013 in Labrador. However, the understanding of sport hunting is different in each region. Quebec considers hunting by non-Aboriginals as sport hunting, whereas Labrador justifies hunting by non-Aboriginal Labradoreans as subsistence hunting. Inuit elders and hunters, holding their traditional knowledge, believe their extent of hunting is negligible because they do not entail or act on overharvesting. Additionally, traditional knowledge holders share that caribou have been essential resources for cultures, functioning as sources of food and clothing. Fauna in the Torngat Mountains as well as the views from the Mountains are some of the aspects of attraction.

Visitors and activities 
The park welcomes fewer than 600 visitors a year. Visitors can visit the park by air, sea or on foot to deepen their understanding of the wild nature of this magnificent landscape and the cultural connections to the people who live here. On the northern arm of the Saglek Fjord in Silluak, visitors, accompanied by armed Inuit escorts, traverse paths extending from rocky beaches, over low shrubs and ravines, and finally to a tranquil glacial lake. During the way, visitors can search for caribou or bears, swim in waterfalls or pristine lakes, and enjoy a fresh Arctic char lunch and tea with local Inuit.

Here is a list of some of the official recommended activities: animal watching, mountain climbing, lookout, stargazing, backcountry camping, hiking, mooring, bird watching, kayaking, photography.

Impact of climate change 
The climate of Northern Nunatsiavut, Labrador, has been warming since the 1980s, and summer sea ice declines by 30 percent each decade, snow days have also decreased across the region. Sea ice plays an integral role in regulating the climate, suppressing temperatures, and the dwindling amount of sea ice near coastlines has been linked to the frequent exposure of local residents to unprecedented heat in recent years.

It also has been shown to have an impact on tundra productivity. Regions throughout the Arctic will experience "shrubification" - shrubs will grow taller, bigger, and appear in previously unknown locations. According to forecasts, between 2039 and 43, the bush-dominated habitat in Torngat Mountains National Park is expected to increase by about 50% compared to 2014.

Shrubification can challenge the survival of local Inuit and wildlife. Excessive shrubs can have an impact on travel in summer and winter, making transportation tools like snowmobiles more dangerous. It also makes it more difficult to understand the location of black or polar bears, and not knowing their location effectively can make tourists dangerous and increase the chance of conflict between tourists and them. Shrubification has affected local food production and gathering, especially with reduced berry availability and productivity. It also harms lichen abundance and diversity, depriving the Torngat Mountain caribou population of an important food source.

See also

List of National Parks of Canada
List of Canadian provincial parks
Nunatsiavut

References

External links
Official Parks Canada website
Parks Canada - Announcement of establishment of Torngat Mountains National Park Reserve
Park page at Newfoundland and Labrador Government site

Protected areas established in 2008
National parks in Newfoundland and Labrador